Bullet is a 1985 Indian Telugu-language action drama film directed by Bapu, written and produced by Mullapudi Venkata Ramana. The film stars Krishnam Raju and Suhasini. The music was scored by K. V. Mahadevan. The lyrics were penned by Veturi.

Cast
Krishnam Raju as Ch. V. V. Varahala Raju / Bullet
Suhasini as Usha
Gummadi
Rao Gopal Rao as Raoji
Prabhakar Reddy
S. Varalakshmi

Soundtrack

References

External links

1985 films
Indian action drama films
Films directed by Bapu
Films with screenplays by Mullapudi Venkata Ramana
Films scored by K. V. Mahadevan
1980s action drama films
1980s Telugu-language films
1985 drama films